Jordan Lefort (born 9 August 1993) is a French professional footballer who plays for  club Paris FC as a defender.

Career
Lefort spent time in the youth system at Strasbourg before joining Amiens in 2011, and made his senior debut in the 1–0 win over Châteauroux on 6 August 2013 in the first round of the Coupe de la Ligue. In 2020, he was loaned to the Swiss club Young Boys.

On 30 August 2022, Lefort signed a two-year contract with Paris FC.

Career statistics

References

External links
 

1993 births
Living people
People from Champigny-sur-Marne
Footballers from Val-de-Marne
French footballers
Association football defenders
Amiens SC players
US Quevilly-Rouen Métropole players
BSC Young Boys players
Paris FC players
Ligue 1 players
Ligue 2 players
Championnat National players
Swiss Super League players
French expatriate footballers
Expatriate footballers in Switzerland
French expatriate sportspeople in Switzerland